St. Joseph University, Chümoukedima is a state private, Catholic research university established under Nagaland Govt. Act No. 6 of 2016 and is located in  Ikishe, Chümoukedima in the Chümoukedima District of Nagaland, India. It is run by DMI Sisters & MMI Fathers with the sole goal of providing education to the people of Nagaland. It was started in the year 2016 and is recognized by University Grants Commission (UGC), Approved by All India Council for Technical Education (AICTE).

Courses Offered

Under Graduate Courses 
B.A  (Honours) - (3 Years)

 English
 Sociology
 Political Science
 Psychology and Counseling
 Journalism and Mass Communication
 Education
 Economics
 History
 Bachelor of Business Administration (BBA-Hons.)
 Bachelor of Commerce (B COM-Hons.)
 Bachelor of Social Work (BSW-Hons.)

B.Sc. (Honours) - (3 Years)

 Physics
 Chemistry
 Botany    
 Zoology
 Bio - Technology
 Mathematics
 Bachelor of Computer Application (BCA-Hons.)

Post Graduate Courses 
M.A  - (2 Years)

 English
 Sociology
 Political Science
 Psychology and Counseling
 Education
 Economics
 History
 Human Rights
 Rural Development
 Master of Commerce (M Com - General)

M.Sc. - (2 Years)

 Physics
 Chemistry
 Botany  
 Zoology
 Mathematics

Master of Computer Application (MCA) 2 Year Programme

Master of Business Administration (MBA)
 Marketing
 Finance
 Human Resource

Engineering Courses 
B.Tech - (4 Years)

 Civil Engineering

*All Engineering Courses are approved by AICTE

References

External links

Universities in Nagaland
Chümoukedima
Educational institutions established in 2016
2016 establishments in Nagaland
Private universities in India